LWN may refer to:

 LWN.net, a computing webzine
 LandWarNet, the United States Army's contribution to the Global Information Grid
 Live Well Network, a television network
 Shirak Airport (IATA code), Armenia